The MAC Freedom, in full Middle Atlantic Conference Freedom, is an intercollegiate athletic conference affiliated with the NCAA's Division III. It is one of the three conferences that operate under the umbrella of the Middle Atlantic Conferences; the others are the MAC Commonwealth and the Middle Atlantic Conference, a grouping used for some sports that consists of MAC Commonwealth and MAC Freedom schools. Member institutions are located in New Jersey and Pennsylvania.

Member schools

Current members
The MAC Freedom currently has nine full members, all are private schools. The most recent changes in membership coincided with the 2020 arrival of York College of Pennsylvania as a MAC Commonwealth member. The MAC, which expanded to 18 members with York's arrival, realigned into two leagues of 9 members each. Accordingly, Eastern moved to the MAC Commonwealth, while Arcadia and Lycoming moved from the MAC Commonwealth to the MAC Freedom.

Notes

Enrollment source:

Former members
The MAC Freedom had five former full members, all were private schools:

Notes

Membership timeline

Sports
The MAC Freedom sponsors intercollegiate athletic competition in men's baseball, men's and women's basketball, women's field hockey, men's and women's golf, men's and women's lacrosse, men's and women’s soccer, women's softball, men's and women's tennis, and women's volleyball.  In addition, members also compete in the MAC's Middle Atlantic Conference in men's and women's cross country, men's football, men's and women's ice hockey, men's and women's swimming, men's and women's indoor and outdoor track and field, men's volleyball, and men's wrestling.

Footnotes

References

External links